The White Hills are a low mountain range in the Transverse Ranges, in Santa Barbara County, California south of the town of Lompoc and east of Vandenberg Air Force Base.

References 

Hills of California
Transverse Ranges
Mountain ranges of Santa Barbara County, California